Types of dry stone hut include: 
 Clochán, associated with the south-western Irish seaboard
 Mitato, found in Greece, especially on the mountains of Crete
 Orri, associated with Ariège, France
 Shielings in Scotland
 Trulli, in Apulia, Italy
Uses of dry-stone huts include temporary shelter for shepherds and their animals, permanent habitations for monks or agricultural workers, storage and cheese making. Dry-stone huts may be thatched or roofed with sod, sometimes bound together with plant roots such as those of Madonna lily or sedum.

References

Stonemasonry
Huts